Pseudochromis quinquedentatus, the spiny dottyback, is a species of ray-finned fish from the  Indo-Pacific Ocean, which is a member of the family Pseudochromidae.

References

quinquedentatus
Taxa named by Allan Riverstone McCulloch
Fish described in 1926
Fish of the Indian Ocean
Fish of the Pacific Ocean